"Bryan, Bryan, Bryan, Bryan" is a lyric poem by American poet Vachel Lindsay. Written in August 1919, the poem recounts the dramatic rise and fall of U.S. presidential candidate William Jennings Bryan during the 1896 presidential campaign. The work was first published in The Sun, a New York City newspaper, and later included in Lindsay's 1920 collection The Golden Whales of California And Other Rhymes in the American Language. The poem focuses upon the initial flowering of hope and later widespread despair among Bryan's ardent supporters throughout the electoral vicissitudes of the campaign.

Summary 

The poem chronicles William Jennings Bryan's 1896 presidential campaign as seen through the eyes of an idealistic sixteen-year-old boy who strongly supports the Democratic Party candidate. While attending a Springfield, Illinois rally with his best girl, the young lovers hear the famous Cross of Gold speech recited by Bryan, a former United States Representative from Nebraska.

In the speech, Bryan supports bimetallism or "free silver", which he argues will bring the nation prosperity, and he decries the gold standard, proclaiming that "you shall not crucify mankind upon a cross of gold". Bryan's oft-recited speech becomes one of the most famous political addresses in American history and garners the young boy's undying loyalty.

The boy's spirits are later crushed by Bryan's defeat via political intrigue at the hands of the Republican Party. The poem depicts the election outcome as an ignominious victory of large financial institutions and East Coast elites such as John Pierpont Morgan over the poorer regions and interest groups depicted as friendly toward Bryan such as the American Midwest and farmers.

The poem lists and comments upon many of the key political figures of the 1896 election, including the retiring presidential incumbent Grover Cleveland, the winning candidate William McKinley, and McKinley's innovative campaign manager Mark Hanna. The poem also references contemporary 1890s cultural archetypes such as the Gibson Girl.

References

Citations

Works cited

External links 
 Text of "Bryan, Bryan, Bryan, Bryan" (Library of Congress)
 Text of "Bryan, Bryan, Bryan, Bryan" (Poem Hunter)
 Text of "Bryan, Bryan, Bryan, Bryan" (Read by Steve Kline)

American poems
1919 poems
William Jennings Bryan